This is a list of individual bovines by name. This list includes buffalo, cattle, bulls, cows and calves.

Buffalo
 Black Diamond
 Kenahkihinén
 Mahpiya Ska
 Ralphie the Buffalo

Cattle

Bulls

Bucking bulls
 Bodacious
 Bones
 Bushwacker
 Bruiser
 Chicken on a Chain
 Code Blue
 Dillinger
 Little Yellow Jacket
 Long John
 Mossy Oak Mudslinger
 Oscar
 Red Rock
 Red Wolf
 Shepherd Hills Tested
 Skoal Pacific Bell
 Tornado
 V-61
 Woopaa

Notable bulls
 Durham Ox
 Fukutsuru
 Got
 Islero
 Karvardi
 Kian
 Murciélago
 Ratón
 Shambo
 Toystory

Cows
 Big Bertha
 Brookview Tony Charity
 Cincinnati Freedom
 Craven Heifer
 Elm Farm Ollie
 Emily
 Gangotri
 Grady the Cow
 Lily Flagg
 Missy
 Maudine Ormsby
 Shadow Jubilee
 Turra Coo
 Ubre Blanca
 Pauline Wayne
 Yvonne

Calves
Calf 269
Meadow

bovines